Atelopus farci, the forest stubfoot toad, is a species of toad in the family Bufonidae. Its natural habitat is cloud forest where it lives in streams.

The only known population has undergone a dramatic decline. Once abundant, surveys in 2002–2003 recovered only one tadpole. The species is threatened by both chytridiomycosis and habitat loss. The species was named after the Colombian rebel group FARC in recognition of the fact that their activities had the indirect effect of providing protection for the animal's habitat and not, as the author makes clear, for the group's political agenda.

References

farci
Amphibians of the Andes
Amphibians of Colombia
Endemic fauna of Colombia
Amphibians described in 1993
Taxa named by John Douglas Lynch
Taxonomy articles created by Polbot